Reynella railway station was a railway station in Reynella, South Australia that was part of the Willunga railway line. A station master was appointed in 1915, but by 1965 it was a non-attended crossing station.  Water was available for locomotive purposes. Commercial operations ceased in 1969.

The Willunga railway line and its stations were dismantled in 1972, and have since been mostly replaced by a bicycle path and/or road. A bus interchange was built on the site of the Reynella railway station.

References 

Australian Railway Historical Society Bulletin No 336, October 1965
The Willunga Railway Line Railpage Australia Forum

External links
 Photo of Reynella station, 1969
 Last goods train to depart the Reynella station 1969
 Reynella railway station in 1969 looking southward
 Railway crossing at States Road, Reynella, in June 1969
 Reynella Railway station during the Peace Day celebrations, 1918-1919

Disused railway stations in South Australia